is a passenger railway station located in the city of Himeji, Hyōgo Prefecture, Japan, operated by West Japan Railway Company (JR West).

Lines

Station layout
The station consists of two ground-level opposed side platforms connected by a level crossing. The station is unattended.

Platforms

History
Yobe Station opened on September 1, 1930.  With the privatization of the Japan National Railways (JNR) on April 1, 1987, the station came under the aegis of the West Japan Railway Company.

Passenger statistics
In fiscal 2019, the station was used by an average of 2228 passengers daily.

Surrounding area
Hyogo Prefectural University Himeji Shosha Campus
Hyogo Prefectural Himeji Shikisai High School
Himeji Railway Department

See also
List of railway stations in Japan

References

External links

  

Railway stations in Himeji
Railway stations in Japan opened in 1930